Door Kickers is a real-time tactics video game developed and published by Romanian indie studio KillHouse Games. The game was released for Microsoft Windows on October 20, 2014, and later for iOS and Android on June 24, 2015 and September 4, 2015 respectively. A Nintendo Switch version was released on December 26, 2020, published by QubicGames. In Door Kickers, the player commands the SWAT team of the fictional Nowhere City Police Department, leading them against the city's violent criminals and terrorists.

A spinoff action side-scroller, Door Kickers: Action Squad, was released in 2017. A direct sequel with more faithful gameplay, Door Kickers 2: Task Force North, was released in 2020.

Gameplay 

Door Kickers combines elements of strategy games and tactical shooters. The game is played from a 2D top-down perspective, providing a full view of each level and allowing for full control of the playable characters.

Gameplay is divided into three phases: deployment, planning, and engagement. In deployment, the player is given a basic overview of the level, selecting the SWAT troopers they wish to use and placing them in preset deployment positions. In planning, the game is paused, and the player is directed to plan the individual movements and actions of each trooper; the extent to which the player does this is entirely up to them, and players may freely plan basic entry, map the team's actions through the entire level, or even skip planning entirely. In engagement, the game is unpaused, and the troopers follow their assigned pathing and actions; the player can still draw paths during the engagement stage, and can switch between engagement and planning at any time.

Each trooper's pathing is created by drawing a line from a trooper (or pathing circle) to another location in the level. White circles denote positioning (such as specifically facing in a certain direction), while blue circles denote actions (such as breaching doors, throwing grenades, or collecting evidence). Orange icons on pathing circles or troopers denote a hold order, where the trooper will hold a position or refrain from an action either until visible enemies are neutralized or no longer within their field of vision, or until ordered to continue by the player (done by clicking them or, if assigned to one, activating one of four "go orders"). Most level elements and enemies are concealed by a translucent blue or solid black fog of war effect that is removed when a trooper's field of vision passes through it.

Some missions include sniper support, offered by an unseen police sniper, that can target and instantly kill any enemy visible from their end of the screen.

Team management and equipment 

The player manages a SWAT team of ten troopers, who can have their classes, weapons, armor, utilities, gear, and character customized. Each class has a unique variety of weapons, each of which have stats that cater to particular situations and playstyles. As the team completes missions they will level up, both as a team and individually, improving their individual skills in accuracy, reaction time, and action speed. Stars earned from completing missions can be spent on new weapons and equipment, while doctrine points earned from leveling up the team can be used to improve their overall tactics and efficiency with certain weapon types.

There are five available classes that can be assigned to troopers: Pointman, fast and quick but lacking a primary weapon slot, only armed with handguns; Assaulter, basic and all-rounded, armed with rifles and submachine guns; Breacher, specializing in breaching and close-quarters combat, armed with shotguns; Stealth, able to stealthily flank and kill enemies with suppressed weapons, but otherwise just a weaker Assaulter; and Shield, carrying a ballistic shield able to block bullets, but also very slow, unable to carry equipment or utilities, and only armed with handguns.

Equipment includes flashbangs that stun those in their detonation radius, stinger grenades that can kill or daze depending on proximity, breaching charges that destroy any door but can kill those on the other side, lockpick machines that hasten lockpicking, and tasers that can be used to non-lethally arrest suspects. Utilities include spy cameras to peek through doors without opening them, sledgehammers to quickly breach reinforced doors, bolt cutters to break locks and gates, and breaching kits that combine both but greatly decrease mobility. Body armor improves survivability for specific sides of the trooper's body at the cost of mobility.

Campaigns and missions 
Door Kickers features six main campaigns, each with a certain number of missions and a loose plot involving the NCPD's efforts to stop a criminal organization or defeat terrorists. Single missions are missions not tied to a campaign and can be completed at the player's own leisure. Each mission has a rating of three stars, awarded to the player based on the methods they used to complete the mission.

In campaigns, any sustained casualties are kept until completion (so if a trooper is injured, they will remain injured for that playthrough). If a trooper is killed in a campaign, they are permanently lost, with their stats and rank reset and their character changed. Single missions lack this mechanic, meaning troopers killed in a single mission will be retained.

Door Kickers features a level editor and full modding support, allowing players to create their own levels and download other user-created levels or mods through the Steam Workshop. There is also a level generator, though the maps and options available are very limited.

There are eight mission varieties: "Clear Hostiles", where all enemies in the level must be neutralized; "Hostage Rescue", similar to Clear Hostiles but featuring rescuable civilian hostages; "Bomb Defusal", where a time bomb must be defused before it can detonate; "Stop Execution", essentially Hostage Rescue but with enemies that can execute hostages if not stopped within a certain time frame; "Protect the VIP", where a controllable VIP must be protected from enemy assassins; "Arrest Warrant", where a wanted suspect must be apprehended; "Dope Raid", where evidence must be recovered before suspects can destroy them; and "Robbery in Progress", where robbers must be stopped before they can reach an escape point.

Reception 
Door Kickers was positively received by critics. Rock Paper Shotgun stated "Door Kickers is a smashing top-down tactical masterclass, with enough missions to shake a nightstick at, randomised enemy placements to add further variety, and a bundled level editor allows devious designers to create their own maps and missions … Door Kickers is a complete package of planning, panicking and policing." Indie Statik proclaimed that "...It’s a thing of beauty and manages to capture the planning and satisfying execution of more complex strategy games, as well as the gung-ho and the popping-off of growly man in military shooters. ... It’s probably the best man-shootery game I’ve played in years." In a Giant Bomb Quick Look, Matt Rorie praised it and said he enjoyed the game.

Rock Paper Shotgun awarded Door Kickers their Best Tactics of 2014 award.

Sequels and spin-offs

Door Kickers: Action Squad
Door Kickers: Action Squad is a spinoff of Door Kickers, created on behalf of KillHouse Games by another studio, pixelshard. The game was first teased on August 1, 2017 in a comic on the KHG website. A day later, an official trailer was released. The game was shown at the 2017 Game Developer's Conference. Action Squad was released on early access on November 20, 2017. Full release was on September 10, 2018 for Windows PCs. It received console ports to Nintendo Switch, PlayStation 4, and Xbox One on October 28, 2019. A port for the iOS was released on April 2, 2020. The game received generally positive reviews.

Door Kickers: Action Squad strays from the series' traditional top-down gameplay in favor of a less-serious side-scrolling action game, featuring characters loosely based on the classes from Door Kickers.

Door Kickers 2: Task Force North
Door Kickers 2: Task Force North, a direct sequel to Door Kickers, was released through Steam Early Access on November 3, 2020. While the game was initially planned for a Q4 2016 release, the game received substantial delays and was trapped in development hell for several years. An official release trailer debuted on February 4, 2020, teasing a Q2 2020 release date; however, this too was pushed back several months. 

Door Kickers 2 departs from the law enforcement setting of the first game and is set in the fictional Middle Eastern country of Nowheraki, following special forces operations against terrorists in the region, led by the United States Army Rangers, CIA Special Operations Group, and the Nowheraki SWAT militia.

Door Kickers 2 features improved weapon variety, equipment, AI, and various new gameplay features in a 3D environment. Many features that were criticized in Door Kickers were improved in the sequel, such as the stealth mechanics. Like the first game, Door Kickers 2 features a level editor and full modding support, allowing players to create their own levels and download content made by other players; however, only levels are available on the Steam Workshop, while all other mods are only available on Nexus Mods.

References

External links 
 

2014 video games
Real-time strategy video games
Android (operating system) games
Indie video games
IOS games
Linux games
Video games about police officers
Video games developed in Romania
Windows games
Nintendo Switch games
Cooperative video games
Multiplayer and single-player video games
QubicGames games